Cornelius Bolton may refer to:

 Cornelius Bolton (died 1779), MP for Waterford
 Cornelius Bolton (died 1829), MP for Waterford and Lanesborough